Daviesia decipiens is a species of flowering plant in the family Fabaceae and is endemic to the south-west of Western Australia. It is an intricately-branched shrub with scattered, sharply-pointed oblong or tapering phyllodes, and orange, maroon and crimson flowers.

Description

Taxonomy and naming
This daviesia was first formally described in 1904 by Ernst Georg Pritzel who gave it the name Daviesia pectinata var. decipiens in the Botanische Jahrbücher für Systematik, Pflanzengeschichte und Pflanzengeographie. In 1995, Michael Crisp raised the variety to species status as Daviesia decipiens. The specific epithet (decipiens) means "deceiving".

Distribution and habitat
Daviesia decipiens grows in woodland, mallee and kwongan between Chidlow, Narrogin, Kalgan and Ravensthorpe in the Avon Wheatbelt, Esperance Plains, Jarrah Forest and Mallee biogeographic regions of south-western Western Australia.

Conservation status
Daviesia decipiens is classified as "not threatened" by the Western Australian Government Department of Biodiversity, Conservation and Attractions.

References

decipiens
Eudicots of Western Australia
Plants described in 1904
Taxa named by Ernst Pritzel